Football Saddle is a broad pass at ,  east-southeast of Football Mountain on the ridge between Edisto Inlet and Tucker Glacier in Antarctica. The pass is an all-snow route that can be crossed by sledge, but there are two other saddles close east and west of Football Mountain that are no higher and are more easily crossed on foot, though more difficult by sledge because they are steeper and have stretches of bare rock. It was so named by the New Zealand Geological Survey Antarctic Expedition, 1957–58, because of its proximity to The Football.

References 

Mountain passes of Victoria Land
Borchgrevink Coast